Solstice Wood is a 2006 fantasy novel by American writer Patricia A. McKillip, the sequel to her 1996 novel Winter Rose. It won the 2007 Mythopoeic Fantasy Award for Adult Literature.

Summary
As a bookseller in California, Sylva Lynn has a comfortable life away from her family.  But after receiving word that her grandfather has died, she reluctantly returns to New York for the funeral.  When the old magic protecting their house from the fay fails, Sylva's cousin is kidnapped and replaced with a changeling.  Like her relative  Rois Melior, the hero of Winter Rose, it is only Sylva, who is part fairy herself, who is able to cross the border into the other realm to rescue him and return peace to their ancestral home

Awards
2007 Mythopoeic Fantasy Award for Adult Literature

See also
 Tam Lin
 Elfland

References

External links
 

2006 American novels
American fantasy novels
Novels by Patricia A. McKillip
Ace Books books